Chronicle of Poor Lovers is a 1954 Italian drama film directed by Carlo Lizzani. It competed for the Grand Prix at the 1954 Cannes Film Festival.

Plot 
Florence, spring of 1925, the young typographer Mario moves to the Santa Croce district, in via del Corno, to be closer to his sweetheart, Bianca, thus becoming in turn a "crowsman" (pun between the name of the inhabitants of the via del "Corno", but also the croaking "crows") and finding themselves sharing the daily events of the inhabitants of that small popular world in the dark years of the rise of Fascism.

His landlord is the farrier Corrado, known as Maciste, a well-known anti-fascist and formerly Ardito del Popolo like his friend Ugo, a street vendor of fruit and entertainment. The small street is also home to a couple of convinced fascists: the accountant Carlino Bencini, a legionary from Rijeka and an insurance employee; and his colleague, friend and roommate Osvaldo. Among the other neighbors, the cobbler Staderini; Ristori, owner of the small hotel that houses some prostitutes, including Elisa, the mistress of Nanni the "admonished"; Clara, Bianca's friend and constantly tormented by her boyfriend because she agrees to marry him; Alfredo Campolmi, owner of the grocery store and fresh husband of Milena.

Immobile in bed but constantly informed of what is happening in the street thanks to the little servant Gesuina, "the Lady", a maitresse, establishes a dense network of relationships and binds everyone to herself through the loans she grants.

The quiet coexistence in via del Corno is dramatically broken when Alfredo, just married and determined to make his business prosper, refuses to pay the contribution to the local section of the Fascist Party and suffers a brutal beating, which leaves him so heavily marked in the body that having to go to the sanatorium and give up the grocery store.

Cast
 Anna Maria Ferrero as Gesuina
 Cosetta Greco as Elisa
 Antonella Lualdi as Milena Campolmi
 Marcello Mastroianni as Ugo
 Bruno Berellini as Carlino Bencini
 Irene Cefaro as Clara
 Adolfo Consolini as Maciste
 Giuliano Montaldo as Alfredo Campolmi
 Gabriele Tinti as Mario Parigi
 Eva Vanicek as Bianca Quagliotti
 Wanda Capodaglio as La Signora
 Mimmo Maggio
 Andrea Petricca
 Garibaldo Lucii as Staderini
 Mario Piloni as Osvaldo
 Ada Colangeli as Miss Fidalma
 Giuseppe Angelini

References

External links

1954 films
1950s Italian-language films
1954 drama films
Italian black-and-white films
Films based on Italian novels
Films directed by Carlo Lizzani
Films set in Florence
Films about fascists
Films set in the 1920s
Italian drama films
1950s Italian films